Dębki  is a village in the administrative district of Gmina Krokowa, within Puck County, Pomeranian Voivodeship, in northern Poland.

It is a popular tourist destination, but not so crowded as other places in this region.

Clean beaches and a family-friendly atmosphere make this place perfect for quiet and relaxing holidays.

For details of the history of the region, see History of Pomerania.

The village has a population of 166.

References

Villages in Puck County